The Doomsday plane is a planned Airborne Command Post to be operated by the Russian Air Force. It is based on the Ilyushin Il-96-400-M commercial aircraft airframe and is scheduled to replace the older Ilyushin Il-80 models introduced in the early 1990s.
 
The production of the aircraft was delayed multiple times and is now scheduled to be started in 2024.

Aircraft of comparable role, configuration and/or era
 Boeing E-4
 Boeing E-6 Mercury
 Northrop Grumman E-10 MC2A
 Ilyushin Il-80

See also
 Doomsday plane
 Dead Hand (nuclear war)

References

Ilyushin aircraft
Nuclear command and control
Strategic Rocket Forces